The Pillar House is a historic house that was once located at 26 Quinobequin Road in Newton, Massachusetts, before being moved to its current location in Lincoln. It was built in 1845 and added to the National Register of Historic Places in 1986.

History
For many years it housed a restaurant, until the property was taken by the state by eminent domain in 2003. The state sold the house for $1, provided the purchasers paid to move it.  The house was deconstructed and rebuilt on Old Sudbury Road in Lincoln, Massachusetts, in 2005.

See also
National Register of Historic Places listings in Middlesex County, Massachusetts

References

External links
Pillar House restaurant website

Houses on the National Register of Historic Places in Newton, Massachusetts
Houses completed in 1845
Houses in Lincoln, Massachusetts
Greek Revival architecture in Massachusetts